Tubaria is a genus of fungi in the family Tubariaceae. The genus is widely distributed, especially in temperate regions. Tubaria was originally named as a subgenus of Agaricus by Worthington George Smith in 1870.  Claude Casimir Gillet promoted it to generic status in 1876. The mushrooms produced by species in this genus are small- to medium-sized with caps ranging in color from pale pinkish-brown to reddish-brown, and often with remnants of the partial veil adhering to the margin. Mushrooms fruit on rotting wood, or, less frequently, in the soil. There are no species in the genus that are recommended for consumption.

Species
, the nomenclatural authority Index Fungorum accepts 72 species of Tubaria:

Tubaria abramsii Murrill 1917
Tubaria agrocyboides Singer 1941
Tubaria alabamensis Murrill 1917
Tubaria albostipitata D.A.Reid 1972 – United Kingdom
Tubaria asperata Henn. 1903
Tubaria bellatula Herp. 1912
Tubaria bispora Matheny, P.-A.Moreau, M.A.Neves & Vellinga 2007
Tubaria bogoriensis Henn. 1899
Tubaria canescens Peck 1894
Tubaria caricicola Henn. 1900
Tubaria chillanensis Henn. 1900
Tubaria cisneroana Speg. 1898
Tubaria cistophila Cheype 1997
Tubaria confragosa (Fr.) Harmaja 1978 – United Kingdom
Tubaria confragosula (Singer) Contu 2000
Tubaria conspersa (Pers.) Fayod 1889 – Europe
Tubaria crenulata Murrill 1917
Tubaria decurrens (Peck) Murrill 1917
Tubaria deformata Peck 1898
Tubaria dispersa (L.) Singer 1961 – United Kingdom
Tubaria djurensis Henn. 1891
Tubaria earlei Murrill 1917
Tubaria egestosa Herp. 1912
Tubaria ferruginea Maire ex E.Horak & P.-A.Moreau 2005
Tubaria fimiseda Speg. 1898
Tubaria fiveashiana Grgur. 1997 – Australia
Tubaria furfuracea (Pers.) Gillet 1876 – Europe, Australia
Tubaria fuscifolia Murrill 1945
Tubaria hololeuca Kühner ex E.Horak & P.-A.Moreau 2005
Tubaria hookeri (Speg.) E.Horak 1980
Tubaria incospicua Contu 1990
Tubaria infundibuliformis Henn. & E.Nyman 1899
Tubaria jaffuelii (Speg.) Singer 1969
Tubaria lilliputiana P.-A.Moreau & Borgarino 2007
Tubaria lithocarpicola M.Zang 2001 – China
Tubaria mammosa Henn. 1899
Tubaria minima J.E.Lange 1940
Tubaria minutalis Romagn. 1937 – United Kingdom
Tubaria moseri Raithelh. 1974
Tubaria oblongospora Herp. 1912
Tubaria olivaceonana (Singer) Raithelh. 2004
Tubaria omphaliiformis (Velen.) Wichanský 1960
Tubaria ovoidospora Kalamees & Faizova 1983
Tubaria pallescens Peck 1895
Tubaria pallidispora  J.E.Lange 1940 – United Kingdom
Tubaria pentstemonis Singer 1958
Tubaria pinicola L.Remy 1965
Tubaria platensis  Speg. 1898
Tubaria praecox Murrill 1917
Tubaria praestans (Romagn.) M.M.Moser 1978
Tubaria pseudoconspersa Romagn. 1943
Tubaria pseudoripartites Singer 1952
Tubaria punicea (A.H.Sm. & Hesler) Ammirati, Matheny & P.-A.Moreau 2007
Tubaria romagnesiana Arnolds 1982 – United Kingdom
Tubaria rufofulva (Cleland) D.A.Reid & E.Horak 1983 – Tasmania
Tubaria saharanpurensis Henn. 1901
Tubaria segestria (Fr.) Boud. 1906
Tubaria serrulata (Cleland) Bougher & Matheny 2007
Tubaria stagnicola (Britzelm.) Sacc. & Traverso 1911
Tubaria strigipes (Cooke & Massee) McAlpine 1895
Tubaria strophosa Singer 1969
Tubaria subcrenulata Murrill 1941
Tubaria substagnina Rick 1920
Tubaria tenuis Peck 1896
Tubaria trigonophylla  (Lasch) Fayod 1874
Tubaria umbonata  S.Lundell 1953
Tubaria umbrina Maire 1928
Tubaria velata Dennis 1961
Tubaria venosa  Henn. 1897
Tubaria verruculospora Pegler 1977 – Uganda; Zambia
Tubaria vinicolor (Peck) Ammirati, Matheny & Vellinga 2007
Tubaria virescens Noordel. & K.B.Vrinda 2007

See also
List of Agaricales genera

References

External links

Tubariaceae
Agaricales genera